Puy du Fou is a historical theme park in Les Epesses, in the Pays de la Loire region of western France. It receives more than 2 million visitors every year, making it one of the most popular theme parks in France. In 2019 and 2020, it was the fourth largest theme park in France in terms of attendance, behind Walt Disney Studios, Disneyland Paris, and Parc Astérix.

History
The idea of Puy du Fou began (without a theme park) in 1977, when Philippe de Villiers, a twenty-seven-year-old student (now a politician), decided to create an original show named "Cinéscénie".

On 13 June 1977, he discovered the ruins of an old renaissance castle in the village of Les Epesses near Cholet, and wrote a scenario about a local family named Maupillier (the real name of a soldier of Vendée at the time of the conflict between Vendée and the French Republic during the French Revolution), spanning the period from the fourteenth century until World War II.

Phillippe de Villiers organized an association of 600 members (3650 today) named "l'Association du Puy du Fou" whose current president is Phillippe de Villiers' son, Nicolas de Villiers.

When the first representation of the Cinéscénie began in June 1978, the show did not have great success, but that quickly changed by the end of the first season, and with that success, the show grew into a huge spectacular. It has since spawned its own micro-industry of actors, prop-makers and trainers for the featured horse riding and sword fighting, which, since 1998, has been due to the efforts of the "Académies Junior" who organized shows every year apart from the Cinéscénie, such as the Paris Paname in the "Halle Renaissance" of the Grand Parc, in March 2008.

The Grand Parc of the Puy du Fou was opened near the Cinéscénie in 1989, and is today one of the most popular theme parks in France.

In 2011, the Grand Parc of Puy du Fou hosted the team presentations prior to the Tour de France, which was set to begin in the Vendée.

On 13 August 2018, the Grand Parc launched a program where specially trained rooks fly around the park to pick up cigarette butts and other small pieces of litter. Christophe Gaborit, the park's Head of Falconry, originally trained the birds to participate in the park's falconry show, but later was inspired to teach them how to pick up rubbish left by the park's visitors. By using a specially-created box, which was inspired by a magician's prop, he taught six of his birds—Boubou, Bamboo, Bill, Black, Bricole, and Baco—to deliver bits of trash to the box and exchange them for food. The goal of the project is both to teach the park's visitors about the birds and to discourage littering.

In 2019, the project expanded abroad with the night show  ("The dream of Toledo") about the history of Spain in Toledo, Spain.
It is the first stage of Puy du Fou España. 
In 2021, it expanded into a park with five shows and four villages.

Attractions
The park is split into 26 main shows, each running for approximately 30–40 minutes:

 Le Secret de la Lance (Secret of the Lance) is set in front of the battlements of a medieval Castle. It relates the story of a young shepherdess, Marguerite, who must defend her castle's tower against English knights alone, helped by a lance with supernatural powers.

 Les Vikings (The Vikings) is set in a reconstructed 1000-year-old fortress that is attacked by Viking longships. The story begins with a marriage in the village, just before the arrival of a Viking longboat. Special effects include the emergence of a longboat from under water.
 Le Signe du Triomphe (The Sign of Triumph) is set in a replica of an amphitheatre that is 115 meters long and 75 meters wide. It recreates the atmosphere of Gaul during Roman times. It features a traditional parade of people and animals, gladiatorial combat, chariot racing and executions. It is set during the time of Diocletian, when there was great unrest.
 Le Bal des Oiseaux Fantômes (Dance of the Phantom Birds) is a show set to a mysterious story. Dozens of birds of prey surge from the ruins and swoop low over the heads of the visitors. The falcons are placed on the heads of some visitors wearing hats provided by the falconers. Many of the larger birds are released from a balloon floating far overhead. This ends with some two hundred birds flying at once above the audience.
 Mousquetaire de Richelieu (Richelieu's Musketeer) features musketeers performing swash-buckling sword fighting and Gypsy girls Flamenco dancing in water. Horses also perform special trotting/jumping techniques.
 Le Dernier Panache (The Last Plume) which follows the destiny of a French naval officer, François de Charette de La Contrie, a hero of the American War of Independence, whose life will change dramatically in 1793, in a last fight for freedom. (Thea award for outstanding achievement 2017)
 Le Mime et l'Étoile (The Mime and the Star). This show set to open in 2023 will take guests back to the early years of moviemaking.
 Les Noces de Feu (The Fire Wedding) (except on Fridays and Saturdays during the summer season : cinescénie). This show takes place at night, entirely on water and depicts a love story between two musicians.

The above shows are presented in French, but electronic translators are available. However, immersive shows, especially those relying on live actors, are only available in French. These include:
 Le Monde Imaginaire de La Fontaine (La Fontaine's Imaginary World), a garden where guests discover Jean de la Fontaine's most famous Fables. These are told using automated animations, and more recently actors. Opened in 2012.
 La Renaissance du Château (Renaissance of the Castle), a tour through the centuries in the historical Puy du Fou Castle. Opened in 2014.
 Les Amoureux de Verdun (The Lovers of Verdun), a recreation of a WWI trench during Winter 1916. As guests proceed in the war-torn environment, they listen to the correspondence between a soldier and his wife back home, whom he tries to protect from the horrific realities of war in his letters. Opened in 2015 and won the Thea Award for Outstanding Achievement in 2016, one century after the aforementioned events.
 Le Mystère de La Pérouse (The Mystery of La Pérouse), a recreation of the ill-fated maritime expedition led by Jean-François de La Pérouse. Guests board La Pérouse's ship, La Boussole, and closely follow the story of the Vendean Lieutenant Augustin de Monti. Opened in 2018 and became Europe's Top New Attraction that year.
 Le Premier Royaume (The First Kingdom), a walkthrough retelling the life of King Clovis I. Among many events, this tour includes Clovis's war against the remnants of the Roman Empire, the breaking of the Vase of Soissons, or the Frankish King's subsequent conversion to the Christian faith. Opened in 2019 and was awarded Live Entertainment of the Year.

Other smaller shows are also available only in French:
 Les Automates Musiciens (The Musician Automatons), a musical show displaying automaton characters in the Bourg 1900. Opened in 2004.
 Les Grandes Eaux (The Grand Water Show), a musical fountain show orchestrated to Jean-Baptiste Lully's music.
 Les Chevaliers de la Table Ronde (The Knights of the Round Table), a retelling of the Arthurian Legend in the form of a magic show. Opened in 2013.
 Le Ballet des Sapeurs (Ballet of the Firefighters), a pantomime musical show portrayed by children actors of the Puy du Fou Académie. Opened in 2017.
 Le Grand Carillon (The Grand Carillon), a musical acrobatic show on the belltower of the 18th Century Village. Opened in 2017.

The Cinéscénie

The main show takes place in the evening on a huge outdoor stage behind the ruined castle. It tells the story of the 700 years of history in the area. The Cinéscénie boasts the largest stage in the world, 1200 actors, hundreds of horses and about 800 fireworks per performance. All of the dialogue is in French, but translation headsets are available in five different languages. All of the actors and actresses (even the children) come from the local villages and are volunteers.
The Cinéscénie is only performed during peak season. It is bookable separately and has a separate entrance.

The Nocturnal City
In 2007, the park opened its first hotel to encourage guests to stay on property for longer periods of time. Over the years, the hotels have grown in number, and now form a resort south east of the park named The Nocturnal City (La Cité Nocturne). There are six themed hotels, each allowing guests to choose a century to sleep in.
 The Gallo-Roman Villa (La Villa Gallo-Romaine) is a hotel themed to Ancient Rome which opened in 2007. As the first Puy du Fou hotel, it offers 100 rooms.
 Lescure's Lodgings (Le Logis de Lescure) is the second hotel which opened in 2009. Designed as a Vendean house of the late 18th century, its name refers to Louis Marie de Lescure, a famous Vendean opponent to the French Revolution. Due to its modest size, it features just four luxury suites.
 The Islands of Clovis (Les Îles de Clovis) opened in 2010. This hotel comprises 50 Merovingian stilt houses from the time of King Clovis I built above ponds.
 The Field of the Cloth of Gold (Le Camp du Drap d'Or) is a 2014 replica of the summit meeting of the same name which occurred in 1520 between Francis I of France and Henry VIII of England. Guests stay in one of the 50 royal tents similar to those set up on that occasion.
 The Citadel (La Citadelle) is a hotel themed to a medieval fortress. It opened in 2017 and offers 100 rooms.
 The Great Century (Le Grand Siècle) is a luxury hotel opened in 2020. Themed to the reign of King Louis XIV, its eight ostentatious pavilions inspired by the now-destroyed Château de Marly offer a total of 96 rooms. It also includes a convention center named The Molière Theater (Le Théâtre Molière).

Timeline

Awards
13 August 2011, Puy du Fou won the silver Jupiter at the "Internationale des Feux Loto Quebec", the biggest international competition of pyrotechnics at Montréal.
17 March 2012, Puy du Fou received the Thea Classic Award 2012, for "outstanding, breakthrough visitor attractions that have stood the test of time"  at Los Angeles.
2013: it was awarded the title "Best European theme park" by the Parksmania Awards in Italy.
2014: it received the Applause Award from the International Association of Amusement Parks and Attractions.
2017: it received the "Hall of Fame Award" at Orlando in Florida during the International Association of Amusement Parks and Attractions Expo

See also 
 Puy du Fou España

References

External links

Main site

1978 establishments in France
Amusement parks in France
Buildings and structures in Vendée
Tourist attractions in Pays de la Loire
Tourist attractions in Vendée
Castles in Pays de la Loire
Amusement parks opened in 1978